Team Titans was a comic book published by DC Comics that spun out of DC's New Titans series. It began in September 1992 and ended in September 1994. The Team Titans were first introduced as a shadowy group stalking the Titans. Their backstory was revealed in New Titans Annual #7 by writer Marv Wolfman, and were popular enough to merit their own series, which Wolfman also wrote. Phil Jimenez and Jeff Jensen took over writing duties with issue #13, and co-wrote the book until its cancellation.

Background information
While Wolfman was initially given the title indefinitely, he chose to leave the title in order to devote more time to his two other books, New Titans and Deathstroke. Creative differences between the new writing staff and editorial, combined with flagging sales, led to the book's cancellation in the Zero Hour crossover event.

The series itself ended with no ending; it is revealed (in ambiguous fashion) that the team's mysterious leader was Hank Hall, the traitorous Teen Titan Hawk, also known as Monarch and Extant. In Zero Hour #2, the near 600 plus team (sans Terra and Mirage) suddenly are seen in the distant past and present attacking the heroes gathered to fight against Extant and his master, Hal Jordan. In the future, Terra and Mirage are held at bay by Metamorpho as the Justice League International, Legion of the Super-Heroes, and the Time Trapper stop the entropy rift from destroying New Earth. Time Trapper then sends the 20th century heroes home; somehow, the closure of the rift in the 30th century causes a butterfly effect negating the timeline that spawned the Team Titans, the main team (sans Terra and Mirage, protected by being in the time stream at the time) to cease to exist off-panel. The only other character introduced in the book, Deathwing, survived this sudden erasure of the Team Titans from existence. 
 
After Zero Hour, Mirage and Terra joined the Teen Titans and it is revealed that the two (and Deathwing) were from the present and inserted into the Team Titans by the Time Trapper, to try and stop Monarch's plan. Deathwing is revealed to not be a future version of Dick Grayson (his actual identity remains a mystery). Terra is implied to be the original Terra and finds the grave of the original Terra empty; in truth, she is a member of a race of underground humanoids, who stole Terra's body to duplicate her powers and transform members of the civilization into humans in order to better forge peaceful relations with the surface world. Mirage is revealed to be a normal twenty-something from Brazil.

Story
One of several Team Titans teams from the future, they function as a terrorist cell fighting against a world dictator, Lord Chaos, the son of Donna Troy and Terry Long. Sent ten years into the past, their mission is to kill Donna and prevent his birth. They eventually convince Donna to give up her powers, ensuring her unborn son would be equally powerless. The Team Titans struggle to carve out lives for themselves in their alternate past. Their alternate-future Nightwing comes back in time and briefly joins the team. This version of Nightwing, attacked and corrupted by a dark version of Raven shortly after his arrival, changes his name to Deathwing, and served as her assistant.

During the Zero Hour event, Killowat, Redwing, Dagon, Prestor Jon, and Battalion are all revealed to be from a false time-line, created by the villainous Monarch to act as his sleeper agent assassins during the time crisis. When Monarch (who had turned himself into the time-villain Extant) is defeated, his false futures are destroyed, and the heroes from those futures are erased from existence. Mirage, Terra, and Deathwing survive. It is later established that they are from the current time-line, and were shunted through time and given false memories by the Time Trapper, who wished to use them as sleeper agents against Extant.

In the wake of Zero Hour, Mirage and Terra join the main Titans team. While it was sometimes hinted that Terra may have been the original Tara Markov of the main DCU time-line, the 2008 Terra mini-series established that she was a young woman from a society of nonhuman subterraneans of similar powers who had been surgically altered to look like the original Terra, and who subsequently had amnesia. While Deathwing's true identity is never disclosed, it is firmly established that he is not the future version of Dick Grayson.

References

1992 comics debuts
Characters created by Marv Wolfman
DC Comics American superheroes
DC Comics superhero teams
Teen Titans titles